Church is a Buffalo Metro Rail station located in the 300 block of Main Street (just north of Church Street) in the Free Fare Zone, which allows passengers free travel between Erie Canal Harbor and Fountain Plaza. Passengers continuing northbound past Fountain Plaza are required to have proof-of-payment. Church is the closest to the Buffalo Metropolitan Transportation Center, located two blocks east at Ellicott and North Division Streets.

Bus routes serving Church station
 At Church and Pearl Streets (heading south only):
 8 Main (inbound)
 66 Williamsville
 67 Cleveland Hill
 81 Eastside (inbound)
 At North Division and Main Streets (heading north or west):
 1 William (outbound)
 2 Clinton (outbound)
 4 Broadway (outbound)
 15 Seneca (inbound)
 40 Grand Island (outbound)
 60 Niagara Falls (outbound)
 61 North Tonawanda (outbound)
 64 Lockport (outbound)
 69 Alden (inbound)
 70 East Aurora (inbound)
 72 Orchard Park (inbound)
 75 West Seneca (inbound)
 At Church and Main Streets (heading east only):
 1 William (inbound)
 2 Clinton (inbound)
 3 Grant (inbound)
 4 Broadway (inbound)
 5 Niagara-Kenmore (inbound)
 7 Baynes-Richmond (inbound)
 8 Main (inbound)
 11 Colvin (inbound)
 15 Seneca (outbound)
 20 Elmwood (inbound)
 25 Delaware (inbound)
 40 Grand Island (inbound)
 60 Niagara Falls (inbound)
 75 West Seneca (outbound)
 At Washington and South Division Streets (heading north, south or east):
 1 William (inbound)
 2 Clinton (inbound)
 3 Grant (inbound)
 4 Broadway (inbound)
 5 Niagara-Kenmore (inbound)
 6 Sycamore
 7 Baynes-Richmond (inbound)
 11 Colvin (inbound)
 14 Abbott
 15 Seneca (outbound)
 16 South Park
 20 Elmwood (inbound)
 24 Genesee
 25 Delaware (inbound)
 40 Grand Island (inbound)
 42 Lackawanna
 60 Niagara Falls (inbound)
 66 Williamsville (outbound)
 67 Cleveland Hill (outbound)
 70 East Aurora (outbound)
 72 Orchard Park (outbound)
 74 Hamburg (inbound)
 75 West Seneca (outbound)
 76 Lotus Bay (inbound)
 79 Tonawanda (outbound)
 At Washington and North Division Streets (heading north only):
 3 Grant (outbound)
 5 Niagara-Kenmore (outbound)
 7 Baynes-Richmond (outbound)
 11 Colvin (outbound)
 20 Elmwood (outbound)
 25 Delaware (outbound)

Notable places nearby
Church station is located near:
 Buffalo City Court
 Buffalo City Hall
 Buffalo & Erie County Public Library
 Buffalo Metropolitan Transportation Center
 Burt Flickinger Center
 Erie County Hall
 Ellicott Square Building
 Erie Community College (also Old Post Office)
 Prudential (Guaranty) Building
 Main Place Tower
 WKBW Television Studios

See also
 List of Buffalo Metro Rail stations

References

Buffalo Metro Rail stations
Railway stations in the United States opened in 1984